Red Canyon is a 2008 film directed by Giovanni Rodriguez, produced by Laura Pratt, and written by Rodriguez and Pratt. It was filmed in the badlands of Utah in 2007, and stars Norman Reedus, Justin Hartley and Christine Lakin

The film is also notable for the ending and the directorial debut of Giovanni Rodriguez, the stepson of well-known artist Antonio Martorell.

Synopsis
A brother and sister, Devon (Tim Draxl) and Regina (Christine Lakin), survive a brutal attack in the small town in which their mother was raised.  As adults they return to the town to sell their mother's property and get on with their lives.  They return to the town with three friends: Tom (Justin Hartley), Samir (Ankur Bhatt), and Terra (Katie Maguire).

But in returning home they run into old friend Harley (Noah Fleiss) and old enemy Mac (Norman Reedus), and returning to that dark place awakens a killing rage in a town where everyone has ties that bind.  Regina learns that no one and nothing can be trusted — not even her own memories. She learns the past doesn't simply haunt, it hurts.

Release
Red Canyon premiered at the NYLIFF  and the Strasbourg International Film Festival. It was released in October 2009 and on DVD October 20, 2009.

References

External links
 
 http://www.bloody-disgusting.com/film/2061/headlines
 http://www.prweb.com/releases/2009/10/prweb3052144.htm

2008 films
American horror films
Films set in Utah
2008 horror films
2000s American films